The Piqued Jacks are an Italian rock band formed in 2006 in Buggiano, consisting of Andrea Lazzeretti, Francesco Bini, Tommaso Oliveri and Marco Sgaramella. They are set to represent San Marino in the Eurovision Song Contest 2023 with the song "Like an Animal".

History
The Piqued Jacks were formed in 2006 in Buggiano, Tuscany, Italy.

In 2010 and 2011, the Piqued Jacks released their first two extended plays. In 2012, they worked with Los Angeles-based producer Brian Lanese on their third EP, titled Just a Machine, which was released in January 2013. In March 2014, they worked with Matt Noveskey on the singles "Upturned Perspectives" and "No Bazooka". The band's debut studio album Climb Like Ivy Does was released in 2015. An acoustic version of the album, titled Aerial Roots, was released in 2016.

In 2016, drummer Matteo Cugia left the band and was replaced Damiano Beritelli, who in turn was replaced by Tommaso Oliveri in 2017. In June 2018, the single "Wildly Shine" was released, which was pre-produced by Michael Beinhorn. Four months later, the band released their second studio album, The Living Past, which was produced by Dan Weller. In April 2019, guitarist Francesco Cugia was replaced by Marco Sgaramella.

In 2019, the Piqued Jacks won the award for the Rock category at Sanremo Rock. In May 2020, they became part of the MTV New Generation music container. In September 2020, the single "Safety Distance" was released, their first work with Brett Shaw. In March 2021, they released their third studio album Synchronizer, produced by Julian Emery, Brett Shaw and Dan Weller.

They went on to win the competition, and are therefore set to represent San Marino in the Eurovision Song Contest 2023 held in Liverpool, United Kingdom.

Members

Current members 
 Andrea "E-King" Lazzeretti (2006–present) – vocals, keyboards
 Francesco "littleladle" Bini (2006–present) – bass, backing vocals
 Tommaso "HolyHargot" Oliveri (2017–present) – drums 
 Marco "Majic-o" Sgaramella (2019–present) – guitar, backing vocals

Former members 
 Francesco "Penguinsane" Cugia (2006–2019) – guitar
 Matteo "ThEd0g" Cugia (2006–2016) – drums
 Damiano Beritelli (2016–2017) – drums

Discography

Studio albums 
 2015 – Climb like Ivy Does
 2016 – Aerial Roots
 2018 – The Living Past
 2021 – Synchronizer

Extended plays 
 2010 – Momo the Monkey
 2011 – Brotherhoods
 2013 – Just a Machine

Singles 
 2013 – "My Kite"
 2013 – "Youphoric?!"
 2013 – "Amusement Park"
 2014 – "Upturned Perspectives'
 2014 – "No Bazooka"
 2015 – "Romantic Soldier"
 2016 – "Shyest Kindred Spirit (Acoustic)"
 2018 – "Eternal Ride of a Heartful Mind"
 2018 – "Loner vs Lover"
 2018 – "Wildly Shine"
 2020 – "Safety Distance"
 2020 – "Every Day Special"
 2020 – "Golden Mine"
 2021 – "Elephant"
 2021 – "Mysterious Equations"
 2021 – "Fire Brigade"
 2022 – "Everything South"
 2022 – "Particles"
 2022 – "Sunflower"
 2023 – "Like an Animal"

References 

2006 establishments in Italy
Eurovision Song Contest entrants for San Marino
Eurovision Song Contest entrants of 2023
Italian alternative rock groups
Italian indie rock groups
Italian rock music groups
Musical groups established in 2006